Metin Akpınar (born 2 November 1941) is a Turkish actor. He has been one of the most successful comedians in Turkey.

Biography
He was born in Aksaray, Istanbul, and he graduated from Pertevniyal High School. He pursued his university career in Faculty of Law and Literature at Istanbul.

His professional career started in 1964 in Ulvi Uraz theater with the play "Gözlerimi Kaparım Vazifemi Yaparım". In 1967, he co-founded Devekuşu Kabare Tiyatrosu, the first cabaret theater of Turkey, in 1967, and has been the administrative director since.  

In most of his films he starred with Zeki Alasya, often playing the more shrewd one of the duo.

In 1998, the Turkish Government awarded the title "Devlet Sanatçısı" (literally "State Artist" or "National Artist") to Metin Akpınar.

He is married to Göksel Özdoğdu.

Awards 

 2008 İsmail Dümbüllü Awards "Lifetime Honorary Award"
 47th International Antalya Golden Orange Film Festival Honorary Award
 30th International Istanbul Film Festival Cinema Honorary Awards

Filmography 

Aşk Laftan Anlamaz (Haşmet Dede) 2016
Aşkın Halleri 2012
Papatyam (Necati) 2009-2011
Eve Giden Yol 1914 (Reşat Ağa) 2006
Kısık Ateşte 15 Dakika (Resul) 2006
Amerikalılar Karadeniz'de 2 (Muhtar Salih) 2006
Döngel Karhanesi (Bertan) 2005
Çat Kapı (Hüsnü) 2005
Eğreti Gelin (Tavid) 2004
Lorkestra 2002
Rus Gelin (Damat Adayı) 2002
Güler Misin Ağlar Mısın 2000
Abuzer Kadayıf (Abuzer Kadayıf/Ersin Balkan) 2000
Baykuşların Saltanatı 2000
Güle Güle (Galip) 1999
Propaganda (Rahim) 1999
Yerim Seni 1997
Hastane (Hastabakıcı Hakkı Baharbahçe) 1993
Biz Bize Benzeriz 1992
Namus Düşmanı (Ali) 1986
Patron Duymasın 1985
Yanlış Numara (Erol) 1985
Davetsiz Misafir (Rüstem/Halim) 1983
Dönme Dolap 1983
Baş Belası (Metin) 1982
Şaka Yapma 1981
Vah Başımıza Gelenler 1979
Köşe Kapmaca (Halis) 1979
Petrol Kralları (Metin) 1978
Cafer'in Çilesi (Refik) 1978
Sivri Akıllılar 1977
Aslan Bacanak (Halim) 1977
Hasip İle Nasip 1976
Her Gönülde Bir Aslan Yatar (Danyal) 1976
Nereye Bakıyor Bu Adamlar (Metin) 1976
Güler Misin Ağlar Mısın (Metin) 1975
Nereden Çıktı Bu Velet (Metin) 1975
Beş Milyoncuk Borç Verir Misin (Metin) 1975
Hasret 1974
Mirasyediler (Metin) 1974
Mavi Boncuk (Süleyman) 1974
Köyden İndim Şehire (Hayret) 1974
Salak Milyoner (Hayret) 1974
Oh Olsun (Doktor Metin) 1973
Canım Kardeşim 1973
Yalancı Yarim (Mahmut) 1973
Tatlı Dillim (Metin) 1972

Notes

External links 
 
Sinematürk
 http://arsiv.sabah.com.tr/2005/02/19/ozgenturk.html

1941 births
Living people
Turkish male film actors
Turkish male stage actors
Turkish male television actors
Turkish comedians
Male actors from Istanbul
Istanbul University Faculty of Law alumni
Pertevniyal High School alumni
Golden Orange Life Achievement Award winners